Walter J. "Shorty" Rothensies was an American basketball coach. He served as the head coach for the Trinity Blue and White (now the Duke Blue Devils) during the 1919–20 season, compiling a 10–4 record. 

He went to school at Trinity from 1916 to 1917, before leaving to fight in World War I. Rothensies returned to finish his degree in the fall of 1919.

Head coaching record

References

External links
W.J. Rothensies at Sports-Reference.com

American military personnel of World War I
Duke Blue Devils men's basketball coaches
Duke University Trinity College of Arts and Sciences alumni